Danil Artyukh (born 2 June 2003) is a Kazakhstani water polo player. He competed in the men's tournament at the 2020 Summer Olympics.

References

External links
 

2003 births
Living people
Kazakhstani male water polo players
Olympic water polo players of Kazakhstan
Water polo players at the 2020 Summer Olympics
Place of birth missing (living people)
21st-century Kazakhstani people